Anheretus is a genus of beetles in the family Carabidae, containing the following species:

 Anheretus ambiguus (Sloane, 1892)
 Anheretus gracilis (Germain, 1848)

References

Broscinae